Sanket Bhosale(born 9 May 1988) is an Indian comedian, actor, doctor and television presenter known for his work predominantly in Hindi television. He is known for mimicking voices of many bollywood and hollywood celebrities, notably Salman Khan and Sanjay Dutt. Apart from his artistry, Bhosale is also a trained physician. He made his mimicry debut with the 2012 Laugh India Laugh, where he was among the top 10 finalists. He has worked at 92.7 Big FM in 2013.

Television
2019 Baba ki chowki on MTV Beats, The Kapil Sharma Show, Super Night with Tubelight, The Drama Company, Gangs of Filmistan Zee Comedy Show and Case Toh Banta Hai on amazon miniTV

Personal life
Born in a Marathi family, he was inspired to become a doctor after watching Sanjay Dutt in Munna Bhai M.B.B.S., and has been a vocal fan of the actor, who he has popularly mimicked. He is married to fellow comedian, actress, singer and mimicry artist Sugandha Mishra.

Mimicry
He has frequently mimicked Sanjay Dutt, Salman Khan, Ranbir Kapoor, Kailash Kher, Ajay Devgn, Mithun Chakraborty,  Farhan Akhtar, Javed Akhtar and Nawazuddin Siddiqui.

References

Living people
1988 births
Marathi people